Stanisław Grzelak (born 12 May 1920) was a Polish racing cyclist. He won the 1947 edition of the Tour de Pologne.

References

External links

1920 births
Possibly living people
Polish male cyclists
Place of birth missing